Rümker may refer to:

Carl Ludwig Christian Rümker (1788–1862), German astronomer
Georg Friedrich Wilhelm Rümker (1832–1900), German astronomer born in Hamburg, son of Carl Ludwig Christian Rümker
Mons Rümker, an isolated volcanic formation that is located in the northwest part of the Moon's near side

German-language surnames